Galactitol (dulcitol) is a sugar alcohol, the reduction product of galactose. It has a slightly sweet taste. In people with galactokinase deficiency, a form of galactosemia, excess dulcitol forms in the lens of the eye leading to cataracts.

Galactitol is produced from galactose in a reaction catalyzed by aldose reductase.

The other common galactose metabolism defect is a defect in galactose-1-phosphate uridylyltransferase, an autosomal recessive disorder, which also causes a buildup of galactitol as a result of increased concentrations of galactose-1-phosphate and galactose.  This disorder leads to cataracts caused by galactitol buildup.

References

External links

Sugar alcohols
Sugar substitutes